DPM may refer to:

Science and technology
 Damp-proof membrane, a membrane material applied to prevent moisture transmission
 Defects per million opportunities in manufacturing
 Diesel particulate matter, an occupational hazard due to diesel exhaust
 Di(propylene glycol) methyl ether, chemical compound
 Discrete particle method, any of a family of numerical methods
 Disintegrations per minute, a measure of the activity of the source of radioactivity
 Disappearing Positive Methodology, state-sponsored subversion of drug testing processes in Russian doping programme

Computing
 Data position measurement
 Digital Postmarks

 System Center Data Protection Manager, by Microsoft

Business

 Direct part marking, a barcode methodology used in many industries
 Diversified Project Management

Profession
 Deputy Prime Minister
 Diploma in Psychological Medicine
 Doctor of Podiatric Medicine
 Doctor of Project Management
 Doctor of Plant Medicine
 Doctor of Pastoral Music, in Doctor of Musical Arts

Other uses
 DPM. a variant of the Soviet Degtyaryov machine gun
 Detroit People Mover, an automated people mover system 
 Democratic Party of Macedonians (Demokratska partija Makedonaca), a political party in Serbia
 Disappearing Positive Methodology, in the McLaren Report
 Direct part marking, permanently marking parts with product information
 Disruptive Pattern Material, a camouflage pattern used by the British Armed Forces and others
 German Tank Museum,
Daniel Patrick Moynihan, American politician

See also
 DPMS (disambiguation)
 Deutscher Pfadfinderbund Mosaik (DPBM)

ca:DPM